Evelyn Vicchiarello (24 October 1986) is an Italian former football striker, who played for Florentia of Serie A.

As an Under-19 international she played the 2004 U-19 European Championship, and the following year she played her first game for the senior Italian national team. She was included in the squad for the 2009 European Championship, and subsequently took part in the 2011 World Cup qualifying.

Titles
 1 Italian League (2008)

References

1986 births
Living people
Italian women's footballers
Italy women's international footballers
Serie A (women's football) players
A.S.D. AGSM Verona F.C. players
Women's association football forwards
U.P.C. Tavagnacco players
Fiorentina Women's F.C. players
A.S.D. Reggiana Calcio Femminile players
Florentia San Gimignano S.S.D. players
ACF Firenze players